is a Japanese football player. He plays for YSCC Yokohama.

Club statistics
Updated to 23 February 2018.

References

External links
Profile at YSCC Yokohama
Profile at Grulla Morioka

1992 births
Living people
Kanto Gakuin University alumni
Association football people from Kanagawa Prefecture
Japanese footballers
J3 League players
Iwate Grulla Morioka players
YSCC Yokohama players
Association football midfielders